The Macabre Faire Film Festival is a film festival held on Long Island, New York.
The festival has featured judges and guests such as director Stevan Mena (Bereavement), Eileen Dietz (The Exorcist), Doug Jones (Hell Boy), Cleve Hall (Monster Man), Michael Gingold (Fangoria), Nick Nicholson (CNN Film Critic), Evan Ginzburg (Wrestler) and others.

Awards

References

 Ottone, Robert. "Macabre Faire Film Fest 2013", Longisland.com, January 21, 2013.
 Hellam, Scott. "The Macabre Faire Film Fest Coming to Rockville Centre, NY, June 22-24", Dread Central, June 12, 2012.
 Long Island News & PRs. "3rd Annual Macabre Faire Film Festival” Returns to Long Island This June", Longisland.com, May 3, 2013.

External links
 

Film festivals in New York (state)
Short film festivals in the United States